CSMD1 CUB and Sushi multiple domains 1 is a protein that in humans is encoded by the CSMD1 gene.

Structure 

CSMD1 contains 14 N-terminal CUB domains that are separated from each other by a Sushi domains followed by an additional 15 tandem Sushi domain segment.

Function 

Based on analogy to other proteins that contain Sushi domains, it is believed that the gene product of CSMD1 functions as a Complement control protein.

Clinical significance 

It is a potential tumour suppressor, the deletion of which may result in head and neck carcinomas behaving more aggressively. CSMD1 protein expression was found to be reduced in patients with invasive breast cancer. Functional studies showed that CSMD1 reduction causes cells to transform to a cancer form by increasing their ability to divide, migrate and invade. In a three dimensional model of breast ducts, reduced CSMD1 expression failed breast duct formation.

Certain CSMD1 genetic variants have been found to show an association with risk of developing schizophrenia, consistent with emerging evidence that some forms of schizophrenia may result from dysregulated complement activation in the central nervous system resulting in excessive synaptic pruning.

References

External links

Further reading